The following is a list of notable Chicano rappers who have articles at Wikipedia.

2Mex (Los Angeles, California)
A.L.T. (El Monte, California)
Akwid (Los Angeles, California)
Axe Murder Boyz (Denver, Colorado)
B-Real (Cypress Hill) (South Gate, California)
Baby Bash (Vallejo, California)
Berner (San Francisco, California)
Brownside (South Los Angeles)
Chingo Bling (Houston, Texas)
Crooked Stilo (Los Angeles, California)
DarkRoom Familia (Hayward, California)
Delinquent Habits (East Los Angeles, California)
Demon (Pixley, California)
Deuce Mob (Denver, Colorado)
Don Cisco (San Francisco, California)
Down AKA Kilo (Oxnard, California)
Flaco (Trinidad, Colorado)
Flakiss (Los Angeles, California)
Funky Aztecs (Vallejo, California)
Gemini (Houston, Texas)
Jay Tee (Vallejo, California)
Johnny "J" (Los Angeles, California)
Jon Gee (Talavera, Nueva Ecija/San Diego, California)
Jonny Z (San Diego, California)
Juan Gotti (Houston, Texas)
Kid Frost (Windsor, California)
King Lil G (Los Angeles, California)
Kinto Sol (Milwaukee, Wisconsin)
Kirko Bangz (Houston, Texas)
Knightowl (San Diego, California)
Kung Fu Vampire (San Jose, California)
A Lighter Shade of Brown (Riverside, California)
Lil Rob (San Diego, California)
LSD (Riverside, California)
Lucky Luciano (Houston, Texas)
MC Magic (Phoenix, Arizona)
Mellow Man Ace (Los Angeles, California)
Mr. Knightowl (San Diego, California)
Mr. Shadow (San Diego, California)
N2Deep (Vallejo, California)
NB Ridaz (Phoenix, Arizona)
Proper Dos (Santa Monica, California)
Psycho Realm (Pico-Union, Los Angeles)
Slow Pain (Los Angeles, California)
Snow Tha Product (San Diego, California)
South Park Mexican (Houston, Texas)
Tha Mexakinz (Long Beach, California)
YBV (Lompoc, California)

Chicano
Chicano rappers
Lists of hip hop musicians